José Larraín (25 March 1917 – 29 January 1972) was a Chilean equestrian. He competed in two events at the 1952 Summer Olympics.

References

External links
  

1917 births
1972 deaths
Chilean male equestrians
Chilean dressage riders
Olympic equestrians of Chile
Equestrians at the 1952 Summer Olympics
Pan American Games medalists in equestrian
Pan American Games gold medalists for Chile
Pan American Games bronze medalists for Chile
Equestrians at the 1951 Pan American Games
Equestrians at the 1955 Pan American Games
Equestrians at the 1959 Pan American Games
Sportspeople from Santiago
Medalists at the 1951 Pan American Games
Medalists at the 1955 Pan American Games
Medalists at the 1959 Pan American Games
20th-century Chilean people